Roosevelt is a census-designated place (CDP) in Gila County, Arizona, United States. The population was 28 at the 2010 census.

Geography
The CDP is located on the western edge of Gila County, on the south side of Theodore Roosevelt Lake, a reservoir on the Salt River. The western boundary of the CDP is the Maricopa County line. Arizona State Route 188 runs through Roosevelt, leading southeast  to Globe, the Gila County seat, and northwest  to Payson. Arizona State Route 88, the Apache Trail, has its northern terminus just west of Roosevelt at the Theodore Roosevelt Dam. The highway, which is unpaved for much of its distance, is a National Scenic Byway and leads southwest  to Apache Junction at the eastern edge of the Phoenix area. The Roosevelt CDP is bordered to the southeast by Tonto National Monument.

Demographics

References

Census-designated places in Gila County, Arizona